Catoca Airport  is an airport in the Lunda Sul Province of Angola. It serves the Catoca diamond mine.

The runway had recently been asphalted by Fidens under contract to the Catoca Mine. The usable runway had been shortened slightly and received twice weekly flights from Luanda by TAAG Angolan Airlines on a Monday and a Friday. While these flights were operated by TAAG, they were charter flights reserved for Catoca Mine employees only.

See also
 List of airports in Angola
 Transport in Angola

References

External links 
OurAirports - Saurimo North
OpenStreetMap - Saurimo North

Airports in Angola
Lunda Sul Province